Mlolongo is a city in the Machakos County, Kenya. Its population was estimated at about 136,000 people in 2019. It is a satellite city near Nairobi and part of the Nairobi metropolitan area.
Mlolongo is under Mavoko Municipality

Economy 
majority of the dwellers there depend on businesses (https://mlolongoenterprises.co.ke/)

References 

 
Populated places in Eastern Province (Kenya)